Sergei Yegorovich Gladyshev (born 9 December 1960) is a former Russian football player.

Honours
Tavriya Simferopol
Ukrainian Premier League champion: 1992

References

External links
 
 

1960 births
Living people
Soviet footballers
FC Shinnik Yaroslavl players
FC Spartak Kostroma players
Russian footballers
SC Tavriya Simferopol players
Russian expatriate footballers
Expatriate footballers in Ukraine
Ukrainian Premier League players
Russian expatriate sportspeople in Ukraine
Russian Premier League players
Association football forwards
FC Lukhovitsy players